Issy station (French: Gare d'Issy) is a station in Paris's express suburban rail system, the RER. It is situated in Issy-les-Moulineaux, in the département of Hauts-de-Seine.

In the future, Issy could become a station of Line 15 of the automated regional subway Grand Paris Express. A new station would be built at a depth of −20m, under the avenue de Verdun. A new tramway line to Croix-de-Berny and an extension of the métro line 12 to Issy are also in project.

See also 
 List of stations of the Paris RER

References

External links
 

Railway stations in France opened in 1901
Réseau Express Régional stations in Hauts-de-Seine